A ghost train is a phantom in the form of a train.

Ghost train may also refer to:

Trains
Ghost train, or parliamentary train, a service run rarely to maintain the legal fiction that a station or line remains open
A nickname for the New York City G Train

Amusement rides
Ghost train (ride), or dark ride, an indoor amusement ride 
 Halloween special theme trains at North Norfolk Railway
Ghost Train (Blackpool Pleasure Beach), an amusement ride in Blackpool, Lancashire, England
1979 Sydney Ghost Train fire, a fire at Luna Park Sydney

Books
Ghost Train (book), a picture book by Paul Yee
The Ghost Train (play), written in 1923 by Arnold Ridley

Film and television
Ghost Train (1927 film), starring Guy Newall
The Ghost Train (1931 film), starring Jack Hulbert
The Ghost Train (1933 film), starring Lisette Verea
The Ghost Train (1937 film), starring Hugh Dempster
The Ghost Train (1941 film), starring Arthur Askey
Ghost Train (2006 film), Japanese horror movie
Ghost Train (TV series), broadcast between 1989 and 1991
 "Ghost Train", 1985 episode of Amazing Stories (1985 TV series), directed by Steven Spielberg
 "Ghost Train", 1986 episode of Thomas and Friends (series 2)
Ghost Train (audio story 2011) Torchwood TV Series

Music
Ghost Train, an album by The Hot Club of Cowtown

Songs
"Ghost Train", a concert band composition by Eric Whitacre
"Ghost Train", from the 2019 EP Lost Souls EP by Knife Party
"Ghost Train", from the 2012 album Pop Tune by Shonen Knife
"Ghost Train", from the 1985 self-titled album by Feargal Sharkey 
"Ghost Train", from the 1992 album Delusions of Banjer by Bad Livers
"Ghost Train", from the 1993 album August and Everything After by Counting Crows
"Ghost Train", B-side of "Rock the House" by Gorillaz
"Ghost Train", from the 1992 album Still Life with Guitar by Kevin Ayers
"Ghost Train", from the 1991 album Marc Cohn by Marc Cohn
"Ghost Train", from the 1986 album Dreamtime by The Stranglers
"(Waiting For) The Ghost Train", by Madness
"Ghost Train", the B-side of "New Amsterdam", from the 1980 compilation album Taking Liberties by Elvis Costello

Other
Ghost train, a storm chasers' term for the rear-inflow jet of a tornado
Nazi ghost train, a Belgian Holocaust train

See also
Death train (disambiguation)
Haunted Train (disambiguation)
Phantom train (disambiguation)